The Megascolecidae is a taxonomic family of earthworms which is native to Madagascar, Australia, New Zealand and both South East Asia and North America. All species of Megascolecidae belong to the Clitellata class. Megascolecidae are a large family of earthworms and they can grow up to 2 meters in length. The intercontinental distribution of Megascolecidae helps in favouring the Continental Drift theory.

The distinctive feature that differs Megascolecidae from other earthworm families is their large size in comparison with other earthworm families. They are an essential part of maintaining soil structure, minor carbon sequestration, and maintaining terrestrial ecosystem balance. Megascolecidae is one of many families Annelida phylum. They live in a terrestrial environment and have a preference for soil with high biomass content, high humidity, and warm temperature. There are many different genera of Megascolecidae and the total number of species is still in the exploration stage.

Physiological features 
Different species for Megascolecidae have different physiological features. However, some familiarities of physiological features can be found between species of Megascolecidae. The megascolecidae family are relatively large individuals. In average, the size of earthworms from megascolecidae varies from 1 centimetre and 2 metres in length. The number of spermathecal pores are normally paired or multiple can be present in a species of megascolecidae. The location of spermathecal pores and how they are position in different segmental location is associated with the identification of different megascolecidae species

Earthworm ingest a variety of organic materials that can be found in the soil since they live in terrestrial environments. Earthworm from species Megascolecidae family has the ability to decompose lignocellulose which requires assistance from microorganisms in their digestive system. Aside from microorganism, other things that can be found in earthworms includes digestive enzymes such as amylase, cellulase and proteins in different region of the gut. The chemical digestion mainly occurs in the intestinal caeca of earthworm, these was higher protease activity than in other parts of the gut.

Genital marking of different species in the Megascolecidae family is part of the distinguishing process between species. Thus, genital marking is a unique feature that differs different species from each other.

Reproductive system 
Megascolecidae are oviparous since they lay eggs in order to reproduce. They are biparental. The ideal condition of reproduction for megascolecidae is 25 °C where the megascolecidae egg hatch the quickest and has the highest cocoon production.

The male reproductive organ of Megascolecidae includes testes, seminal vesicles, spermathecae, prostate gland and spermathecal pores. The sperm can be found in testes and seminal vesicles however, it can not be found in spermathecae. The female reproductive organ consist of female pore which normally comes in pairs. Both male and female reproductive organs are present in earthworms because they are monoecious. To breed, two earthworms exchange sperm. Long after they are separated, the egg case is secreted. It forms a ring around the worm then, the worm removes the ring from its body and injects their own eggs and the other worm's sperm into it. Afterwards the egg case will be sealed and ready to be incubated to hatch and become a cocoon.

Life cycle 
Megascolecidae start their life cycle as an egg that will hatch to be a cocoon and later will grow into a full size earthworm. Their lifecycle takes around 50–57 days in average depending on the external environments and habitat. The rate of growth during the first 14 days is very low however, afterward 21 – 28 days the rate of growth increases and then it will increase and decrease throughout the worm's life with no pattern. The growth rate of Megascolecidae is correlated to the temperature of their environment. As the temperature increased from 30 °C it shows a significant growth rate and decreasing the time to sexual maturity. The ideal living temperature of Megascolecidae is around 15 °C to 30 °C. Overall mean growth of a megascolecidae is 1.79 mg/worm/day, 1.57 mg/worm/day and 1.34 mg/worm/day depending on the abundance of worm and size of the environment condition.

Hatching process of Megascolecidae eggs is depending on the temperature of the environment. The incubation during hatching process would decrease in warmer temperature and increase in colder temperature. Due to that, the cocoon production of Megascolecidae is correlated with the temperature of the environment

Distribution and habitat 
Different species of Megascolecidae can be found different parts of the world such as Australia, New Zealand, Asia, North America, South America and Europe. The intercontinental presence of Megascolecidae species can be explained through The Permanence of Continent Theory. This theory provides the explanation of most Cenozoic distributions however, this theory does not explain the presence of European Megascolecidae in North America. The intercontinental distribution of Megascolecidae has two different theories that explains its phenomenon: 1) land bridges and 2) continental drift.

The Megascolecidae family are originally native to Australia. In Australia, there are is number of Megascolecidae species that can be found native in different parts of the country. Anisochaeta sebastiani is an example of species that belongs to Megascolecidae. This species can be found in different parts of Australia from Queensland to Tasmania. There are 53 known species of earthworms that belong Megascolecidae family that can be found in Western Australia. Graliophilus georgei and Graliophilus secundus are some examples of Megascolecidae family that can be found in Western Australia. They belong to the genus Graliophilus. Another species from Graliophilus genus called Graliophilus zeilensis can be found in the Northern Territory specifically, in Mount Zeil, West MacDonnell Ranges. Graliophilus zeilensis can be found on the highest point of the mountain where average rainfall of the region is 250 mm annually. This distinguish them from other species from Graliophilus family because it is below the favourable habitat to support native earthworms. Metaphire and Amynthas are two common genus belonging to Megascolecidae family. This genus can be found in different countries in Asia.

There are eight different species of genus Metaphire that can be found in Malaysia; Metaphire sedimensis, Metaphire hijaunensis, Metaphire songkhlaensis, Metaphire pulauensis, Metaphire pulauensis, Metaphire fovella, Metaphire balingensis, and Metaphire strellana. The commonality between the habitat of these species are that they are found in soil containing medium to high organic material such as loamy soil

In Indonesia, there are nine different genera that can be found throughout the country; Amynthas, Archipheretima, Metaphire, Metapheretima, Pheretima, Pithemera, Planapheretima, Pleinogaster and Polypheretima. Each of these genus can be found in every single continents in Indonesia. Pheretimoid is the biggest group of genera which is consisting of 65 and 38 Species respectively. Some infra-generic groups are restricted to the mainland of Asia, however, others are native to Indo-Australian Archipelago.

The ideal habitat for Megascolecidae is consisting of terrestrial environment with soil that has high content of organic material such as; loamy soil, cattle solids, pig solids and aerobically digested sewage sludge. Megascolecidae grows and produces more cocoons during the summer months comparing to the winter months. This is because their life cycle is highly correlated to the temperature and humidity of the environment. They prefer to grow in highly humid and warm temperature areas which is their ideal habitat. However, some Megascolecidae species have adapted to colder temperatures and drier areas which enables them to live in higher regions of the land.

Ecology 
Megascolecidae can be found in terrestrial environment. They are an important part of the soil ecosystem in that they indicate soil health and maintain soil productivity. The abundance of earthworms is highly correlated to soil pH, texture, water content, and temperature. Earthworm has the ability to bio-monitoring soil pollutants. This is because of earthworm's burrowing habit that serves as a facilitation of preferred water flow and agrochemical through the soil profile thus, earthworms are able to perform carbon sequestration and reducing soil pollutants. Invasive earthworms can have a significant impact causing changes in soil profiles, nutrient and organic matter content and other soil organisms or plant communities. In most cases the disturbed areas includes agricultural systems or previously areas that are lacking of earthworms would see the biggest impact of the invasive earthworms. The impact of earthworm towards soil structure is cause by the rate of net nitrogen mineralization.

Genera 

 Aceeca Blakemore, 2000
 Aridulodrilus Dyne, 2021
 Amphimiximus Blakemore, 2000
 Amynthas Kinberg, 1867
 Anisochaeta Beddard, 1890
 Anisogogaster Blakemore, 2010
 Aporodrilus Blakemore, 2000
 Archipheretima Michaelsen, 1928
 Arctiostrotus McKey-Fender, 1982
 Argilophilus Eisen, 1893
 Austrohoplochaetella Jamieson, 1971
 Begemius Easton, 1982
 Caecadrilus Blakemore, 2000
 Chetcodrilus Fender & McKey-Fender, 1990
 Comarodrilus Stephenson, 1915
 Cryptodrilus Fletcher, 1886
 Dendropheretima James, 2005
 Deodrilus Beddard, 1890
 Didymogaster Fletcher, 1886
 Digaster Perrier, 1872
 Diporochaeta Beddard, 1890
 Drilochaera  Fender & McKey-Fender, 1990
 Driloleirus Fender & McKey-Fender, 1990
 Duplodicodrilus Blakemore, 2008
 Eastoniella Jamieson, 1977
 Fletcherodrilus Michaelsen, 1891
 Gastrodrilus Blakemore, 2000
 Gemascolex Edmonds & Jamieson, 1973
 Geofdyneia Jamieson, 2000
 Graliophilus Jamieson, 1971
 Haereodrilus Dyne, 2000
 Healesvillea Jamieson, 2000
 Heteroporodrilus Jamieson, 1970
 Hiatidrilus Blakemore, 1997
 Hickmaniella Jamieson, 1974
 Hypolimnus Blakemore, 2000
 Isarogoscolex James, 2005 
 Kincaidodrilus McKey-Fender, 1982
 Lampito Kinberg, 1867
 Macnabodrilus Fender & McKey-Fender, 1990
 Megascolex Templeton, 1844
 Megascolides McCoy, 1878
 Metapheretima Michaelsen, 1928
 Metaphire Sims & Easton, 1972
 Nelloscolex Gates, 1939
 Nephrallaxis Fender & McKey-Fender, 1990
 Notoscolex Fletcher, 1886
 Oreoscolex Jamieson, 1973
 Paraplutellus Jamieson, 1972
 Pericryptodrilus Jamieson, 1977
 Perionychella Michaelsen, 1907
 Perionyx Perrier, 1872
 Perissogaster Fletcher, 1887
 Pheretima Kinberg, 1867
 Pithemera Sims & Easton, 1972
 Planapheretima Michaelsen, 1934
 Pleionogaster Michaelsen, 1892
 Plutelloides Jamieson, 2000
 Plutellus Perrier, 1873
 Polypheretima Michaelsen, 1934
 Pontodrilus Perrier, 1874
 Propheretima Jamieson, 1995
 Provescus Blakemore, 2000
 Pseudocryptodrilus Jamieson, 1972
 Pseudonotoscolex Jamieson, 1971
 Retrovescus Blakemore, 1998
 Scolecoidea Blakemore, 2000
 Sebastianus Blakemore, 1997
 Simsia Jamieson, 1972
 Spenceriella Michaelsen, 1907
 Tassiedrilus Blakemore, 2000
 Terrisswalkerius Jamieson, 1994
 Tonoscolex Gates, 1933
 Torresiella Dyne, 1997
 Toutellus Fender & McKey-Fender, 1990
 Troyia Jamieson, 1977
 Vesiculodrilus Jamieson, 1973
 Woodwardiella Stephenson, 1925
 Zacharius Blakemore, 1997

References

External links 
 

 
Haplotaxida
Annelid families